Viktor Pihlak (15 December 1886 – 10 July 1967 Tallinn) was an Estonian architect and politician.

In 1920 he was Minister of Commerce and Industry.

References

1886 births
1967 deaths
Government ministers of Estonia
Estonian architects
Architects from Tallinn